The 2018 Tulsa Roughnecks FC season was the 4th season for Tulsa Roughnecks FC, now known as FC Tulsa, in the United Soccer League (USL), the second-tier professional soccer league in the United States and Canada.

Club
As of June 18, 2018

Competitions

United Soccer League

Standings

Match results

Unless otherwise noted, all times in CDT

U.S. Open Cup

References

Sports in Tulsa, Oklahoma
FC Tulsa seasons